Tommy Moroney (10 November 1923 – 2 May 1981) was an Irish soccer and rugby union player. Moroney played soccer for Cork United, West Ham United, Evergreen United and Ireland. In 1949 he was a member of the Ireland team that defeated England 2–0 at Goodison Park, becoming the first non-UK team to beat England at home. He also represented both Cork Constitution and Munster at rugby union.

Early years in Cork

Together with Frank O'Farrell, Moroney was a member of the successful Cork United team of the 1940s, helping them win several League of Ireland titles. A brilliant all-round sportsman, Moroney had also played rugby union for Presentation Brothers College and Cork Constitution, helping the latter to win the Munster Senior Cup three times. He also represented Munster, but with the Five Nations Championship suspended because of the Second World War, he never got the chance to play for the Ireland national rugby union team.

West Ham United

Moroney moved to West Ham United in 1947, making his debut in the English Second Division on 1 September 1947 against Millwall. In January 1948 he was joined at the Hammers by his former Cork United teammate, Frank O'Farrell. Moroney played 148 league games for the Hammers, scoring 8 goals. He also played a further three games for the club in the FA Cup. He played his last game for West Ham on 3 April 1953 in a 2–1 defeat against Fulham. He subsequently returned to Cork where he finished his playing career with Evergreen United.

Irish international

Moroney made 12 appearances for Ireland between 1948 and 1953. He scored his only goal for Ireland, on his international debut, in a 2–1 away defeat against Spain on 30 May 1948. He was also a member of the Ireland team that defeated England 2–0 at Goodison Park, becoming the first non-UK team to beat England at home. He played his last game for Ireland on 4 October 1953 against France in a World Cup qualifier.

Honours

Rugby Player

Cork Constitution

Munster Senior Cup
Winners 1942, 1943 1946 3

Soccer Player

Cork United

League of Ireland
Winners 1941, 1942, 1943, 1945, 1946  5
FAI Cup
Winners 1942, 1947 2
League of Ireland Shield
Winners 1943 1
Munster Senior Cup
Winners 1941, 1945, 1946, 1947 4

See also
List of players who have converted from one football code to another

References

Bibliography

External links
 Ireland stats
 Goal against Spain
Goal against Spain
 Cork City fansite
List of West Ham players
 West Ham stats
 Cork Constitution history

1923 births
1981 deaths
Association footballers from Cork (city)
Association football midfielders
Republic of Ireland association footballers
Irish rugby union players
Munster Rugby players
Cork Constitution players
Ireland (FAI) international footballers
West Ham United F.C. players
Cork United F.C. (1940–1948) players
League of Ireland players
League of Ireland managers
Rugby union players from County Cork
Republic of Ireland football managers